Eumamurrin is a rural locality in the Maranoa Region, Queensland, Australia.

Road infrastructure
The Carnarvon Highway runs through from south-west to north-west.

References 

Maranoa Region
Localities in Queensland